Wakrat is the debut studio album by American rock band Wakrat released on November 8, 2016.

Track listing

Personnel 
Wakrat
 Tim Commerford – vocals, bass guitar
 Mathias Wakrat – drums, percussion
 Laurent Grangeon – guitar, vocals
 Erik Colvin – engineer 
 Brendan O'Brien – mixing engineer

References 

2016 albums
Wakrat albums
Earache Records albums